Che Kung (02 January, 1235-30 December, 1330), also known as Che Da Yuan Shuai, was originally a military commander of Southern Song Dynasty (1127–1279), who, according to lore, had supreme power to suppress rebellion and was renowned for his loyalty to the Emperor. He was also famous for his power to suppress plagues and his skill in medicine. He is believed by some worshipers to have been involved in the attempt to keep the Song state alive by bringing Prince Ping and his brother to the South. He is now considered the God of Protection.

Life

Che Kung was a native of Nanchang, in Jiangxi Province of China. As a military commander, he saved the southern regions of China from destruction and disorder. Also, he appeared in many villagers dreams who were suffering from a plague at that time. After the plague was over, the villagers believed that Che Kung had miraculously saved them from the terrible plague. Taoists regarded him as a Deity due to his miracles and blessings. Inside a temple of Che Kung, pinwheels can always be found next to his effigy. It is believed that the one who rotates the pinwheel at a certain direction can receive good luck. The Birthday of Che Kung is celebrated on the second day of Chinese New Year.

See also
 The Birthday of Che Kung: a celebration dedicated to Che Kung
 Che Kung Miu: temples dedicated to Che Kung (located in Sha Tin & Sai Kung)
 I Shing Temple, dedicated to Hung Shing and Che Kung
 Hong Kong Government Lunar New Year kau chim tradition

References

External links

Hong Kong Tourism Board

Song dynasty generals
Chinese gods
Deified Chinese people
Date of death unknown
Year of birth unknown